Rodrigo Rojas may refer to:

 Rodrigo Rojas de Negri (1967-1986), Chilean photographer who was tortured during demonstrations against Pinochet
 Rodrigo Rojas Vade (born 1983), Chilean political activist
 Rodrigo Rojas (footballer) (born 1988), Paraguayan footballer